Zeng Yaqiong (born 8 January 1976) is a Chinese retired badminton player. She was the girls' singles silver medalist at the 1994 World Junior Championships. Zeng competed at the 1997 East Asian Games in South Korea, helping the team clinch the gold medal, and won a bronze medal in the women's singles event. She left the national team at the end of 1999, and went to the United Kingdom to studying English for a year. In UK, she trained in Milton Keynes, and still competing in the international tournaments.

Achievements

Asian Cup 
Women's singles

East Asian Games 
Women's singles

World Junior Championships 
Girls' singles

IBF World Grand Prix 
The World Badminton Grand Prix sanctioned by International Badminton Federation (IBF) from 1983 to 2006.

Women's singles

Women's doubles

IBF International 
Women's singles

Mixed doubles

References

External links 
 

1976 births
Living people
People from Xiamen
Badminton players from Fujian
Chinese female badminton players